Gerald Martin (born 1944) is a critic of Latin American fiction. He is particularly known for his work on the Guatemalan author Miguel Ángel Asturias and Colombian author Gabriel García Márquez, both Nobel Prize for Literature winners.

His 2008 book, Gabriel García Márquez. A Life, was the first full biography of García Márquez to be published in English.

Biography
Gerald Martin (London 1944) studied Spanish, French and Portuguese at Bristol (1965) and received his PhD in Latin American Literature from the University of Edinburgh (1970). After spending a year in Cochabamba, Bolivia, with VSO (1965-6), he later carried out postgraduate work in UNAM, Mexico (1968-9) and, as a Harkness Fellowship recipient, was a visiting scholar at Stanford University (1971-2). By 1990 he had visited every country in Latin America. He taught for many years at Portsmouth Polytechnic, where he helped to organise the world’s first undergraduate degree in Latin American Studies, which pioneered the student year abroad in Latin America. In 1984 he became the first Professor of Hispanic Studies in the Polytechnic sector. He went on to work for 25 years as the only English-speaking member of the Colección Archivos in Paris and in Pittsburgh became President of the Instituto Internacional de Literatura Iberoamericana. During the period 1992-2007 he was the Andrew W. Mellon Professor of Modern Languages in the University of Pittsburgh.

His research and publications have focused on the Latin American novel. His PhD was devoted to Miguel Angel Asturias, who fortunately won the Nobel Prize before it was completed, and he has produced critical editions of Hombres de maíz (1981) and El Señor Presidente (2000), as well as translating the former work. He has also translated novels by Rafael Chirbes and Max Aub.

In the 1980s he concentrated on the history of literature and the arts, contributing three major chapters to the Cambridge History of Latin America and publishing Journeys through the Labyrinth: Latin American Fiction in the Twentieth Century (1989). Since then he has focused on biography. In 2008 he published a biography of Gabriel García Márquez with Bloomsbury and Knopf, which has appeared in twenty languages, and in 2012 an Introduction to Gabriel García Márquez for CUP. He is currently working on a biography of Mario Vargas Llosa for Bloomsbury.

Works

External links
homepage at the University of Pittsburgh.

Latin Americanists
British literary critics
Living people
Literary critics of Spanish
1944 births